Lee Wen (1957–2019) was a Singapore-based performance artist who shaped the development of performance art in Asia. He worked on the notion of identity, ethnicity, freedom, and the individual's relationship to communities and the environment. Lee's most iconic work is his performance series titled The Journey of a Yellow Man, which started as a critique of racial and ethnic identities in 1992 and has evolved into a meditation on freedom, humility, and religious practices over more than a decade. Painting his own body with bright yellow poster paint, he expresses an exaggerated symbol of his ethnic identity as a citizen of Singapore. He was also active in artist-run initiatives, especially as part of The Artists Village (TAV) in Singapore, the performance artist collective Black Market International, as well as the festivals Future of Imagination and Rooted in the Ephemeral Speak (R.I.T.E.S.). On 3 March 2019, he died due to a lung infection, at the age of 61.

Education
Lee Wen studied in the now defunct Kim Keat Primary School and Raffles Institution. After finishing his A levels, he worked as a logistics officer, a computer operator and a bank officer. In 1988, he left behind his banking career to enroll at the Lasalle-SIA College of the Arts at the age of 30. Lee Wen expressed himself with both painting and various non-traditional media, being influenced by performance artist Tang Da Wu and other experimental artists Amanda Heng and Vincent Leow from The Artists Village. In 1990, Lee went on to study at the City of London Polytechnic, and it was then that Lee had found his true calling as a performance artist. He went on to develop the Yellow Man persona which gained him his first recognition in the arts community. The Journey of a Yellow Man, his most iconic performance series, has included performances, mixed-media installation, and paintings.

Exhibitions and festivals 
Lee Wen's work quickly gained international recognition since 1993, having performed and showcasing his artistic expressions in many international locations such as Gwangju Biennale and the Third Asia-Pacific Triennial of Contemporary Art (APT3), Queensland Art Gallery, Brisbane, Australia in 1999. Where he performed Journey of a Yellow Man No.13

His solo exhibitions include Journey of a Yellow Man No.3: DESIRE, The Substation, Singapore (1993); Neo-Baba, VA-Nishiogi Gallery, Tokyo (1995); Handmade Tales, The Black Box, Theatreworks, Singapore (1996); Everybody Should Be Happy, Utterly Art, Singapore (2002); Strange Fruit, The Substation, Singapore (2003); Unframed 7, P-10, Singapore (2004); Freedom of Daydreams, Mothers of Imagination, Your MOTHER Gallery, Singapore (2007); and Anthropometry Revision, Soo Bin Art Gallery, Singapore (2008).

In 2012, Singapore Art Museum organized a mid-career retrospective titled Lucid Dreams in the Reverie of the Real, featuring more than forty installations, photographs, and videos. In 2019, Hong Kong-based nonprofit Asia Art Archive organized an exhibition with his sketchbooks and notebooks, highlighting these as "sites of performance."

In 2003, Lee spearheaded The Future of Imagination, international performance art festival at The Substation and at the Sculpture Square in 2004, featuring international performance artists such as Alastair MacLennan from Northern Ireland, Irma Optimist from Finland, and Marilyn Arsem from USA. Lee saw the value of having an annual gathering of international artists in Singapore, to share a continuing interest in the cultural constructs of identity in the global situation and current trends of contemporary art practice, through live performances and discussion forms.

Recognition and archive 
Lee taught art at Tokyo National University of Fine Arts and Music and at his alma-mater back home in Singapore. He had also taught workshops at Hanoi University of Fine Arts, University of Ulster, UK, Universidad Autónoma Metropolitana, Mexico City, and Musashino Art University, Tokyo.

In 2005, Lee Wen was presented with the Cultural Medallion, the highest cultural award in Singapore, for his contributions to the development of local contemporary art scene.

In 2015, Lee Wen was shortlisted for the Joseph Balestier Award for the Freedom of Art, which honors a Southeast Asian artist or curator whose work is actively committed to advocating freedom. He won the award in 2016.

In collaboration with NTU Centre for Contemporary Art Singapore and National Gallery Singapore as a supporting collaborator, Asia Art Archive digitized the artist's personal archive, which includes materials about his practice as an artist, organizer, and writer starting in the early 1980s.

See also

Cultural Medallion
The Artists Village (TAV)

References

Further reading
 Chin Hock Seng (1981), 'Pop dog' artist shares a dream, The Straits Times, Singapore. 9 May 1981
 Lee Wen (1981) A Waking Dream – drawings and poetry, Singapore : Select Books
 Ng Sek Chow, Yellow reflections, The Straits Times, Singapore, 23 July 1993
 Chandrasekaran.S., Langenbach, R. & Lee Wen (1993), Local Performance Art, Democracy: Commentary. Journal of the National University of Singapore Society, Singapore, National University of Singapore Society (Vol.11 No. 2)
 Swinson, James, Lee Wen Connection / Location, Third Text/ no.45 Winter, London 1998–99 – pp. 95–97
 Lee Weng Choy, Artist essay on Lee Wen, The Third AsiaPacificTriennale 1999 Catalogue, Queensland Art Gallery, Brisbane Australia.
 Lee Weng Choy, (2000), Just What Is it that Makes the Term Global-Local So Widely Cited, Yet So Annoying?, "Flight Patterns: picturing the Pacific Rim" catalogue, Museum of Contemporary Art Los Angeles (A shorter version of this essay was first published in Artlink, Volume 20 Number 2, June 2000.)
 Woon Tien Wei, Between Journeys: an Interview with Lee Wen, Performance Research 6(l), pp. 3 7 Taylor & Francis Ltd 2001
 Barragan, Paco, The Art To Come, Subastas Siglo XXI, Madrid 2002
 Oon, Clarissa, Hello, yellow fellow, The Straits Times, Singapore, 21 October 2003
Gunalan Nadarajan, Russell Storer and Eugene Tan Contemporary Art in Singapore Institute of Contemporary Arts Singapore, LASALLE, Singapore 2007
Valentin Torrens, Editor Pedagogia De La Performance, Programmas de Cursos y Talleres Diputacion Provincial De Huesca, Barcelona, Spain, 2007
Lee Wen, Editor Anthropometry Revision Soo Bin Art International, Singapore, 2008
Kwok Kian Woon, Lee Wen, Co-Editors The Artists Village: 20 Years on Singapore Art Museum, The Artists Village, Singapore, 2009
Richard Martel Arte en vivo y en directo EXIT Express Magazine No. 47 November 2009, p16-25
Adele Tan, Art and the iterative force: Lee Wen's untaming of Yves Klein PAJ: A Journal of Performance and Art, May 2010, Vol. 32, No. 2, Pages 17–23
Iola Lenzi, Tan Boon Hui, Khairuddin Hori, editors, et al.. Negotiating Home History and Nation Two Decades of Contemporary Art in Southeast Asia 1991–2011 Singapore Art Museum 2011 Christine Van Assche, Patricia Levasseur de la Motte, et, all ... Video, an Art, a History 1965 – 2010 A Selection from the Centre Pompidou and Singapore Art Museum Collections Singapore Art Museum 2011
Mitsu Salmon Lee Wen's Revolutionary Daydreams, IN TIME December 2013, newsletter, Chicago, pg.22, 23
 Glenis Israel, Senior Artwise 2 visual arts 11–12, Part 3 Asian Artists – contemporary, Chapter 14, John Wiley & Sons Australia Ltd, Sydney 2004
 HO Tzu Nyen, "Strange fruit", ArtAsiaPacific, Spring 2004 No.40

External links
 Biography and list of works
 Future of Imagination
 "Yellow Man"
 Lee Wen at 4th ASIATOPIA
  Text by Lee Wen – "Connection/location"
 Journey of a Yellow Man

1957 births
2019 deaths
Singaporean people of Chinese descent
Singaporean performance artists
Singaporean artists
Raffles Institution alumni
Recipients of the Cultural Medallion for art